Tabitha Stevens (born February 16, 1970) is the stage name for an American pornographic actress. In 2007 she was inducted into the AVN Hall of Fame.

Career
Stevens joined the adult-entertainment industry in the summer of 1995 at the age of 25 after meeting erotic performer Racquel Darrian and Darrian's then-husband Derrick Lane at a gym. She started out at first in photo spreads for adult magazines Cheri and Hustler.  She was married at the time but divorced her husband soon after entering the industry. Her first scene was with Bobby Vitale in Rolling Thunder for Vivid Entertainment. She took a seven-year hiatus from performing before returning to the business in 2009. During her hiatus, she owned a sex shop with an ex-husband.

In 2007, she was inducted into the AVN Hall of Fame.

Mainstream media appearances
Stevens has appeared on The Howard Stern Show over 25 times and has made appearances in five seasons of Dr. 90210. She has also appeared in various roles in other television series. Stevens holds a SAG card and has also done commercial work for Capcom's Street Fighter as well as a number of SEGA TV-commercials.

Personal life
Stevens is divorced from porn producer/director and ex-mafioso Kenny Gallo. Their short-lived marriage included a Jerry Springer Show episode titled "I'm Married to a Porn Star!" They divorced in 1997. She was then married to porn producer Don Osterholt. They divorced in 1999. On March 17, 2007, she married porn producer and director Gary Orona, who has a production studio in Utah.

Stevens has reportedly spent approximately $200,000 on plastic surgery. On her original website she describes herself as a "plastic surgery junkie" and provides a list of the many procedures she has undergone:

Stevens has stated that her favorite male performer to work with is Ron Jeremy, and the two are close friends.

References

External links

 Official web site
 
 
 
 

American pornographic film actresses
Living people
Pornographic film actors from New York (state)
1970 births
21st-century American women